Dumb Days is the debut studio album by Australian alternative rock band Tired Lion It was released through Dew Process and the Universal Music Group in September 2017. The album was produced by Violent Soho frontman Luke Boerdam. Australian radio station Triple J picked Dumb Days as their feature album of the week in September 2017. While the band didn't chart in the Hottest 100 of 2017, the first three singles charted in the Hottest 200 with Dumb Days, Fresh and Cinderella Dracula coming in at #185, #179 and #150 respectively.

Track listing

iTunes/Google Play/Spotify Edition

Personnel 
Credits adapted from the album's liner notes.

Tired Lion
 Sophie Hopes – Vocals & Guitar
 Matt Tanner – Guitar
 Nick Vasey – Bass
 Ethan Darnell – Drums

Additional performers
 Dave Parkin - Synth on "Cilantro", Acoustic Guitar on "Hawaiifive0"
 Troy Stockley - Backing Vocals on "Cinderella Dracula"

Charts

References

2017 debut albums
Tired Lion albums
Dew Process albums